The Buffalo Museum of Science is a science museum located at Martin Luther King Jr. Park in Buffalo, New York, United States, northeast of the downtown district, near the Kensington Expressway.  The historic building was designed by August Esenwein and James A. Johnson and opened on January 19, 1929.  The attractions include exhibits showcasing animals, astronomy, the science of technology, and additional science topics.

Exhibitions

Explorations
Explorations is an interactive gallery for children ages two to seven featuring new themes every month.

Explore You Science Studio
Explore You is a health systems science studio. The space was remodeled and opened in March 2012. The interactive exhibit gives a hands-on approach to health, exploring topics such as healthy choices, body systems, the heart, medical technology, genetics, and related research done in Western New York. It is sponsored by prominent local health insurance company Independent Health.

Rethink Extinct Science Studio
The Rethink Extinct Science Studio opened in March 2015 as remodel of the previous Extinction Gallery. This exhibit focuses on all aspects of extinction throughout the history of life on this planet including present-day extinctions and endangered plants and animals.

The Extinction Gallery was a collection of fossils and cultural pieces relating to organisms that have gone extinct on the planet.  Specimens include 50-million-year-old birds, feathers and flowers, the earliest known land plant, a trilobite trapped in a seashell nearly 400 million years ago, a cast of a Tyrannosaurus rex skull, a compression fossil replica of  Archaeopteryx, Triceratops horridus, Deinonychus antirrhopus, and Allosaurus fragilis. Many of the pieces in this exhibit come from the previous Dinosaurs and Co. space at the museum. In addition, a specimen of Albertosaurus sarcophagus (nicknamed "Stanley") is displayed in the first floor lobby next to admissions.

Nano
Nano is an interactive exhibition that engages family audiences in nanoscale science, engineering, and technology. Hands-on exhibits present the basics of nanoscience and engineering, introduce some real world applications, and explore the societal and ethical implications of this new technology.

Other exhibitions
Additional exhibitions include the Buffalo in Space Science Studio (opened in 2017), the Artifacts Science Studio (opened in March 2014), the In Motion Science Studio (opened in 2013), the Our Marvelous Earth Science Studio (opened in 2012), and the Bug Works Science Studio (opened in 2013).

In 2010 the museum began an extensive renovation campaign, the goal of which was to convert the old diorama based exhibits into interactive Science Studios. This campaign culminated with the renovation and reopening of the Kellogg Observatory in July 2018

Previous exhibits

Whem Ankh: The Cycle of Life in Ancient Egypt
Whem Ankh was an exhibit running from 1998 to 2013 displaying artifacts from the daily life as lived on the banks of the lower Nile River 2,200 years ago. Over 250 artifacts are included in the collection, including the mummies of Nes-hor and of Nes-min, priests in the temple of the Egyptian fertility god Min, and the coffin of Djed-hor-ef-ankh.

Intended as a temporary exhibit, it was made permanent due to its initial popularity, which it enjoyed through most of its tenure. Whem Ankh closed in July 2013 to make way for construction of the Culture Science Studio which was set to open in April 2014.

Marchand Hall of Wildflowers
The Marchand Hall of Wildflowers displayed numerous wax models of species of plant life created throughout several decades by naturalists George and Paul Marchand.

Additional features
The museum also features the National Geographic 3D Cinema, Elements Cafe, and the Curiosity Shop.

See also
List of observatories
List of museums in New York (state)

References

External links
 The Buffalo Museum of Science homepage

Science museums in New York (state)
Natural history museums in New York (state)
Museums in Buffalo, New York
Dinosaur museums in the United States
Institutions accredited by the American Alliance of Museums
1861 establishments in New York (state)
Museums established in 1861
Paleontology in New York (state)